, occasionally credited as Shusuke Sakino, is a Japanese actor and voice actor.

Filmography

Television animation
1990s
Virtua Fighter (1996) (A Watchman)
Detective Conan (1997) (Mokunen)
2000s
Zoids: New Century (2001) (Captain Stigma Stoeller)
Heat Guy J (2002) (Gene Glen)
Lupin the 3rd - Episode 0: The First Contact (2002) (Shade)
Tank Knights Fortress (2003) (White Tiger)
Astro Boy (2003) (Bird)
Major (2004) (Hideki Shigeno)
Zoids Fuzors (2004) (Keith)
Rockman.EXE Axess (2004) (Windman)
Naruto (2004) (Sakon, Ukon)
Samurai Champloo (2004) (Mori)
Trinity Blood (2005) (Count Alfred Meinz)
Ginga Legend Weed (2005) (Blue)
A Spirit of the Sun (2006) (Kurofuji)
Bleach (2006) (Ryo Utagawa)
Kekkaishi (2006) (Sanan)
Lupin III: Seven Days Rhapsody (2006) (Fire)
Noein (2006) (Makoto Shinohara)
Ghost Hound (2007) (Tatsumi Toyooka, Tsuneji Izawa)
Darker than Black (2007) (Kirk Lindsay)
Nabari no Ou (2008) (Somei Shimizu)
Viper's Creed (2009) (Zaliche)
2010s
Blade (2011) (Stan Davis)
Jewelpet Sunshine (2011) (Munata)
One Piece (2013) (Scotch)
Ping Pong (2014) (Ryuichi "Dragon" Kazama)
Terror in Resonance (2014) (Kenjirō Shibazaki)
Tokyo Ghoul √A (2015) (Yoshitoki Washū)
Magic Kaito 1412 (2015) (Dan Mitsuishi)
Lupin the 3rd (2015) (Nix)
Subete ga F ni Naru (2015) (Seiji Shindō)
91 Days (2016) (Corvo)
One Piece (2018) (Charlotte Daifuku)
O Maidens in Your Savage Season (2019) (Hisashi Saegusa)
Pet (2020) (Katsuragi)
Joran: The Princess of Snow and Blood (2021) (Janome)

Original video animation (OVA)
Demon Prince Enma (2006) (Yoshinaga)

Theatrical animation
Legend of the Millennium Dragon (2011) (Kishin)
The Tibetan Dog (2012) (Sumudu)
Ghost in the Shell: Arise - Border:3 Ghost Tears (2014) (Ishikawa)
Psycho-Pass: The Movie (2015) (Tadao Miyazaki)
Ghost in the Shell: The New Movie (2015) (Ishikawa)

Web animation
Mobile Suit Gundam Thunderbolt (2015) (Graham)
Blade of the Immortal -Immortal- (2019) (Eiku Shizuma)

Video games
Final Fantasy X (2001) (Rin)
Final Fantasy X-2 (2003) (Rin, Bechlam)
Yakuza (2005) (Osamu Kashiwagi)
Yakuza 2 (2006) (Osamu Kashiwagi)
Yakuza 3 (2009) (Osamu Kashiwagi)
Alan Wake (2010) (Japanese dub) (Alan Wake)
Rhythm Thief & the Emperor's Treasure (2012) (Borwen)
Phoenix Wright: Ace Attorney - Dual Destinies (2013) (Jin Yuugami/Simon Blackquill)
Ryū ga Gotoku Ishin! (2014) (Inoue Genzaburō)
Yakuza 0 (2015) (Osamu Kashiwagi)
Yakuza Kiwami (2016) (Osamu Kashiwagi)
Pokémon GO (2016) (Slugma and Magcargo)
Phoenix Wright: Ace Attorney − Spirit of Justice (2016) (Jin Yuugami/Simon Blackquill)
For Honor (2017) (Kensei)
Crash Bandicoot N. Sane Trilogy (2017) (Doctor N. Gin)
Yakuza Kiwami 2 (2017) (Osamu Kashiwagi)Xenoblade Chronicles 2 (2017) (Gort)Xenoblade Chronicles 2: Torna – The Golden Country (2018) (Gort)Fist of the North Star: Lost Paradise (2018) (Toki)
Devil May Cry 5 (2019) (Urizen)
Kingdom Hearts III (2019) (Hamm)
Overwatch (2019) (Baptiste)
Crash Bandicoot 4: It's About Time (2020) (Doctor N. Gin)
Yakuza: Like a Dragon (2020) (Osamu Kashiwagi ("The Bartender"))
Ghostwire: Tokyo (2022) (Hannya)
Anonymous;Code (2022) (Tengen Ozutani)

Tokusatsu
Juukou B-Fighter (1995) - Black Beet (episodes 19-29, 31-33 & 35-43) (Shadow Played by Seiji Takaiwa & Keisuke Tsuchiya)

Dubbing

Voice-double
Patrick Wilson
Watchmen (Daniel Dreiberg/Nite Owl II)
Morning Glory (Adam Bennett)
Insidious (Josh Lambert)
Young Adult (Buddy Slade)
Prometheus (Shaw's father)
The Conjuring (Ed Warren)
Insidious: Chapter 2 (Josh Lambert)
Stretch (Stretch)
Home Sweet Hell (Don Champagne)
The Conjuring 2 (Ed Warren)
Annabelle Comes Home (Ed Warren)
Midway (Edwin T. Layton)
The Conjuring: The Devil Made Me Do It (Ed Warren)
Moonfall (Brian Harper)
Ethan Hawke
Assault on Precinct 13 (Sgt. Jake Roenick)
Lord of War (Agent Jack Valentine)
Cymbeline (Iachimo)
Born to Be Blue (Chet Baker)
Regression (Detective Bruce Kenner)
In a Valley of Violence (Paul)
24 Hours to Live (Travis Conrad)
Valerian and the City of a Thousand Planets (Jolly the Pimp)
Stockholm (Kaj Hansson / Lars Nystrom)
The Kid (Sheriff Pat Garrett)
The Guilty (Sergeant Bill Miller)
The Black Phone (Albert Shaw / The Grabber)
Raymond & Ray (Ray)
Glass Onion: A Knives Out Mystery (Efficient Man)
Mark Wahlberg
The Departed (Staff Sgt. Sean Dignam)
The Lovely Bones (Jack Salmon)
Contraband (Chris Farraday)
Ted (John Bennett)
Broken City (Billy Taggart)
Lone Survivor (Marcus Luttrell)
Ted 2 (John Bennett)
Patriots Day (Tommy Saunders)
Mile 22 (James Silva)
Ben Affleck
Changing Lanes (Gavin Banek)
Gigli (Larry Gigli)
Paycheck (Michael Jennings)
Daredevil (Matt Murdock/Daredevil)
Surviving Christmas (Drew Latham)
He's Just Not That Into You (Neil Jones)
State of Play (Stephen Collins)
Runner Runner (Ivan Block)

Film
10,000 BC (Ka'Ren (Mo Zinal))
10.0 Earthquake (Jack (Henry Ian Cusick))
1987: When the Day Comes (Kim Jeong-nam (Sol Kyung-gu))
27 Dresses (George (Edward Burns))
300 (King Xerxes (Rodrigo Santoro))
300: Rise of an Empire (King Xerxes (Rodrigo Santoro))
40 Days and 40 Nights (Chris (Glenn Fitzgerald))
.45 (Reilly (Stephen Dorff))
Alice in Wonderland (Lowell (John Hopkins))
Aliens (Private Drake (Mark Rolston))
Aliens vs. Predator: Requiem (Dallas Howard (Steven Pasquale))
Angels & Demons (Mr. Gray/The Assassin (Nikolaj Lie Kaas))
Armored (Mike Cochrane (Matt Dillon))
Arthur and the Invisibles (Francis (Doug Rand))
Arthur and the Revenge of Maltazard (Armand (Robert Stanton))
The Assassination of Jesse James by the Coward Robert Ford (Jesse James (Brad Pitt))
Bad Company (Jake Hayes/Kevin Pope/Michael Turner (Chris Rock))
Bad Education (Enrique Goded (Fele Martínez))
Battle: Los Angeles (USMC Cpl. Jason "Cocheez" Lockett (Cory Hardrict))
Before Night Falls (Lazaro Gomez Carriles (Olivier Martinez))
Behind Enemy Lines (Captain Rodway, USMC (Charles Malik Whitfield))
Below (Steven Coors (Scott Foley))
Blackhat (Chen Dawai (Wang Leehom))
Bohemian Rhapsody (Ray Foster (Mike Myers))
Breakin' All the Rules (Evan Fields (Morris Chestnut))
The Call (Officer Paul Phillips (Morris Chestnut))
The Cat's Meow (Thomas H. Ince (Cary Elwes))
Chaos (Jason York, a.k.a. Lorenz/Scott Curtis (Wesley Snipes))
Charlie's Angels (2003 TV Asahi edition) (Jason Gibbons (Matt LeBlanc))
Charlie's Angels: Full Throttle (Jason Gibbons (Matt LeBlanc))
Charlie and the Chocolate Factory (Mr. Bucket (Noah Taylor))
The Chronicles of Narnia: Prince Caspian (General Glozelle (Pierfrancesco Favino))
Cloverfield (Hudson "Hud" Platt (T.J. Miller))
Coco Before Chanel (Arthur Capel (Alessandro Nivola))
Collateral Damage (Claudio "Wolf" Perrini (Cliff Curtis))
Crash (Anthony (Chris "Ludacris" Bridges))
The Darwin Awards (Harvey (David Arquette))
Dawn of the Planet of the Apes (Carver (Kirk Acevedo))
Dead Man Down (Alphonse Hoyt (Terrence Howard))
Deadly Impact (Tom Armstrong (Sean Patrick Flanery))
The Devil's Backbone (Jacinto (Eduardo Noriega))
Did You Hear About the Morgans? (U.S. Marshal Lasky (Seth Gilliam))
Dirty (Officer Armando Sancho (Clifton Collins Jr.))
Doctor Zhivago (Pasha Antipov (Tom Courtenay))
Dreamgirls (Curtis Taylor, Jr. (Jamie Foxx))
Eastern Promises (Kirill (Vincent Cassel))
The Edge of Seventeen (Mr. Bruner (Woody Harrelson))
Elegy (Kenneth Kepesh (Peter Sarsgaard))
Enemy of the State (Jones (Scott Caan))
Fading Gigolo (Fioravante (John Turturro))
The Family Stone (Everett Stone (Dermot Mulroney))
Fast & Furious (Fenix "Rise" Calderon (Laz Alonso))
The Fifth Estate (Julian Assange (Benedict Cumberbatch))
The Forgotten (Mr. Shineer (Linus Roache))
The French Dispatch (Moses Rosenthaler (Benicio del Toro))
Game Change (Todd Palin (David Barry Gray))
Gangster No. 1 (Young Gangster (Paul Bettany))
Ghost Ship (Jack Ferriman (Desmond Harrington))
G.I. Joe: Retaliation (Firefly (Ray Stevenson))
The Girl Next Door (Kelly (Timothy Olyphant))
Gran Torino (Duke (Cory Hardrict))
The Great Gatsby (George Wilson (Scott Wilson))
The Grudge (Doug McCarthy (Jason Behr))
Half Past Dead (Donald Robert Johnson (Morris Chestnut))
Hart's War (Major Joe Clary (Rick Ravanello))
Hannibal Rising (Kolnas (Kevin McKidd))
Henry Fool (Steve (Paul Boocock))
High Noon (2021 Star Channel edition) (Deputy Marshal Harvey Pell (Lloyd Bridges))
Homefront (Morgan "Gator" Bodine (James Franco))
Homeland (David Estes (David Harewood))
House of Wax (Wade (Jared Padalecki))
I Am Number Four (Mogadorian Commander (Kevin Durand))
I.D. (Bob (Warren Clarke))
Inception (Eames (Tom Hardy))
In the Bedroom (Richard Strout (William Mapother))
Into the Storm (Peter "Pete" Moore (Matt Walsh))
The Interpreter (Phillipe (Yvan Attal))
Jack the Giant Slayer (Crawe (Eddie Marsan))
Jane Got a Gun (Dan Frost (Joel Edgerton))
Jay and Silent Bob Strike Back (Jay (Jason Mewes))
John Carter (Sab Than (Dominic West))
K-19: The Widowmaker (Petty Officer Pavel Loktev (Christian Camargo))
King Arthur: Legend of the Sword (Sir William "Goosefat Bill" Wilson (Aidan Gillen))
Kingmaker (Kim Woon-beom (Sol Kyung-gu))
Knight and Day (Antonio Quintana (Jordi Mollà))
Ladder 49 (Dennis Gauquin (Billy Burke))
The Lake House (Morgan Price (Dylan Walsh))
Land of the Dead (Riley Denbo (Simon Baker))
The Last Castle (Yates (Mark Ruffalo))
The Last Stand (Frank Martinez (Rodrigo Santoro))
Line Walker 2: Invisible Spy (CIB Chief Inspector Ching (Nick Cheung))
The Long Way Home (Jang Nam-bok (Sol Kyung-gu))
The Lookout (Gary Spargo (Matthew Goode))
The Man (Joey Trent / Kane (Luke Goss))
Man on Fire (Samuel Ramos (Marc Anthony))
May (Adam Stubbs (Jeremy Sisto))
Me and You and Everyone We Know (Richard Swersey (John Hawkes))
The Merciless (Jae-ho (Sol Kyung-gu))
The Milagro Beanfield War (Joe Mondragon (Chick Vennera))
Milk (Dan White (Josh Brolin))
Mission: Impossible 2 (2006 TV Asahi edition) (Ulrich (Dominic Purcell))
Mother of Tears (Detective Enzo Marchi (Cristian Solimeno))
The Monuments Men (Lt. James Granger (Matt Damon))
Mulan (Bori Khan (Jason Scott Lee))
My Big Fat Greek Wedding (Ian Miller (John Corbett))
My Life in Ruins (Poupi Kakas (Alexis Georgoulis))
Mystic River (Sean Devine (Kevin Bacon))
New Year's Eve (Jensen (Jon Bon Jovi))
Noel (Michael Riley (Paul Walker))
Once Upon a Time in America (Maximilian "Max" Bercovicz/Christopher Bailey (James Woods))
Once Upon a Time in Mexico (General Marquez (Gerardo Vigil))
One Hour Photo (Will Yorkin (Michael Vartan))
Only the Brave (Eric Marsh (Josh Brolin))
Operation Red Sea (Yang Rui (Zhang Yi))
Out of Time (Chris Harrison (Dean Cain))
Panic Room (Officer Keeney (Paul Schulze))
The Paperboy (Ward Jansen (Matthew McConaughey))
The Paradine Case (Anthony Keane (Gregory Peck))
A Perfect Getaway (Nick (Timothy Olyphant))
Platoon (2003 TV Tokyo edition) (Junior (Reggie Johnson))
Poseidon (Dylan Johns (Josh Lucas))
Priest (Salesman (Brad Dourif))
The Prince (Paul (Jason Patric))
Push (Pinky Stein (Nate Mooney))
Quarantine 2: Terminal (Henry (Josh Cooke))
The Queen (Tony Blair (Michael Sheen))
Race (Larry Snyder (Jason Sudeikis))
The Raven (Ivan Reynolds (Sam Hazeldine))
Red Riding Hood (Cesaire (Billy Burke))
Resident Evil (Chad Kaplan (Martin Crewes))
Robin Hood: Prince of Thieves (Guy of Gisbourne (Michael Wincott))
Rush (Alastair Caldwell (Stephen Mangan))
The Sapphires (Dave Lovelace (Chris O'Dowd))
Say It Isn't So (Gilbert Noble (Chris Klein))
Secondhand Lions (Walter Caldwell (adult) (Josh Lucas))
Secretary (Peter (Jeremy Davies))
Seven Psychopaths (Billy Bickle (Sam Rockwell))
Shadowboxer (Clayton Mayfield (Stephen Dorff))
The Shape of Water (Richard Strickland (Michael Shannon))
Shark Night (Dennis (Chris Carmack))
Sherlock Holmes (Lord Coward (Hans Matheson))
Silent Hill: Revelation (Detective Santini (Jefferson Brown))
Six Bullets (Andrew Fayden (Joe Flanigan))
Sky Captain and the World of Tomorrow (Joseph "Joe" Sullivan/Sky Captain (Jude Law))
The Smurfs (Patrick "Pat" Winslow (Neil Patrick Harris))
The Smurfs 2 (Patrick "Pat" Winslow (Neil Patrick Harris))
Snatch (2017 Blu-Ray edition) (Franky Four-Fingers (Benicio del Toro))
Snow White and the Huntsman (Finn (Sam Spruell))
Sonic the Hedgehog 2 (Randall Handel (Shemar Moore))
Space Cowboys (Ethan Glance (Loren Dean))
Spellbound (Dr. Anthony Edwardes/John Ballantyne (Gregory Peck))
Starship Troopers 2: Hero of the Federation (Lieutenant Pavlov Dill (Lawrence Monoson))
Stir of Echoes (Tom Witzky (Kevin Bacon))
Summer Catch (Ryan Dunne (Freddie Prinze Jr.))
S.W.A.T. (Alexander "Alex" Montel (Olivier Martinez))
Sweet Sixteen (Stan (Gary McCormack))
Teenage Mutant Ninja Turtles (Vern Fenwick (Will Arnett))
Teenage Mutant Ninja Turtles: Out of the Shadows (Vern Fenwick (Will Arnett))
Tenacious D in The Pick of Destiny (Satan (Dave Grohl))
Terminator 2: Judgment Day (T-1000 (Robert Patrick))
The Texas Chainsaw Massacre (Kemper (Eric Balfour))
Thor (Volstagg (Ray Stevenson))
Thor: The Dark World (Volstagg (Ray Stevenson))
The Three Burials of Melquiades Estrada (Ptmn. Mike Norton (Barry Pepper))
Thunderball (Felix Leiter (Rik Van Nutter))
Thunderbird 6 (Captain Foster (impostor) (John Carson))
Tigerland (Pvt. Johnson (Russell Richardson))
Tomorrowland (Eddie Newton (Tim McGraw))
Transformers: Dark of the Moon (Roadbuster (Ron Bottitta))
Trapped (Joe Hickey (Kevin Bacon))
Tremors 3: Back to Perfection (Agent Frank Statler (Tom Everett))
Triangle (Greg (Michael Dorman))
Tron: Legacy (Jarvis (James Frain))
Troy (Achilles (Brad Pitt))
The Truth About Charlie (Il-Sang Lee (Park Joong-Hoon))
Two Brothers (Zerbino (Vincent Scarito))
Unconditional Love (Dirk S. (Rupert Everett))
Underwater (W. Lucien (Vincent Cassel))
Underworld: Blood Wars (Marius (Tobias Menzies))
An Unfinished Life (Sheriff Crane Curtis (Josh Lucas))
The Wailing (Il-gwang (Hwang Jung-min))
Warrior (Brendan Conlon (Joel Edgerton))
White Boy Rick (Richard Wershe Sr. (Matthew McConaughey))
White House Down (Carl Killick (Kevin Rankin))
Written on the Wind (Kyle Hadley (Robert Stack))
The Yearling (PDDVD edition) (Ezra "Penny" Baxter (Gregory Peck))
You Don't Mess with the Zohan (Fatoush "Phantom" Hakbarah (John Turturro))
You, Me and Dupree (Carl Peterson (Matt Dillon))
The Young Victoria (Lord Melbourne (Paul Bettany))
Your Highness (Leezar (Justin Theroux))
Zathura (Astronaut/Walter Budwing (adult) (Dax Shepard))

Television
24 (Larry Moss (Jeffrey Nordling), Hamri Al-Assad (Alexander Siddig))
The Agency (Matt Callan (Gil Bellows))
The Americans (Stan Beeman (Noah Emmerich))
The Andromeda Strain (Major Bill Keane (Ricky Schroder))
Body of Proof (Dr. Charlie Stafford (Luke Perry))
Californication (Eddie Nero (Rob Lowe))
Castle (Marcus Gates (Lee Tergesen))
Chuck (Cole Barker (Jonathan Cake))
Criminal Minds (Derek Morgan (Shemar Moore))
CSI: Crime Scene Investigation (David Hodges (Wallace Langham))
Desperate Housewives (Rick Coletti (Jason Gedrick))
Dirty Sexy Money (Reverend Brian Darling Sr. (Glenn Fitzgerald))
The Dresden Files (Harry Dresden (Paul Blackthorne))
The Handmaid's Tale (Commander Frederick Waterford (Joseph Fiennes))
Heroes (Isaac Mendez (Santiago Cabrera))
It (Eddie Kaspbrak (Dennis Christopher))
Game of Thrones (Jorah Mormont (Iain Glen))
Gilmore Girls (Luke Danes (Scott Patterson))
Lost (Desmond Hume (Henry Ian Cusick))
Moon Knight (Arthur Harrow (Ethan Hawke))
Nikita (Michael (Shane West))
Nip/Tuck (Christian Troy (Julian McMahon))
Numbers (Charlie Eppes (David Krumholtz))
Obi-Wan Kenobi (The Grand Inquisitor (Rupert Friend))
Once Upon a Time (Sidney Glass/Magic Mirror (Giancarlo Esposito))
One Tree Hill (Keith Scott (Craig Sheffer))
Pan Am (Roger Anderson (David Harbour))
The Pillars of the Earth (King Stephen (Tony Curran))
Power Rangers Samurai (Dekker (Ricardo Medina, Jr.))
Power Rangers Super Samurai (Dekker (Ricardo Medina, Jr.), Eugene "Skull" Skullovitch (Jason Narvy))
Prison Break (Agent Todd Wheatley (Chris Bruno))
Project Runway season 2 (Santino Rice (himself))
Revolution (Miles Matheson (Billy Burke))
Royal Pains (Henry "Hank" Lawson (Mark Feuerstein))
Salem's Lot (Ben Mears (Rob Lowe))
Samantha Who? (Todd Deepler (Barry Watson))
Spartacus: Blood and Sand (Crixus (Manu Bennett))
The Strain (Dr. Ephraim Goodweather (Corey Stoll))
S.W.A.T. (Sergeant II Daniel "Hondo" Harrelson Jr. (Shemar Moore))
Third Watch (James "Jimmy" Doherty (Eddie Cibrian))
Torchwood (The Cousin (Chris Butler))
V (George Sutton (David Richmond-Peck))
The Vampire Diaries (Alaric Saltzman (Matthew Davis))
Vegas (Deputy Jack Lamb (Jason O'Mara))
The Walking Dead (Governor Philip Blake (David Morrissey))
The West Wing (Congressman Matt Skinner (Charley Lang))
The Young Pope (Cardinal Andrew Dussolier (Scott Shepherd))

Animation

Monkey King: Hero Is Back (Sun Wukong)
Toy Story 4 (Hamm)

References

External links
 Official blog
 

Japanese male video game actors
Japanese male voice actors
Living people
Male voice actors from Miyazaki Prefecture
1965 births
20th-century Japanese male actors
21st-century Japanese male actors